Jori Pintay (possibly from Quechua quri gold, pintay to paint / painting (a borrowing from Spanish pintar to paint)) is a mountain in the Vilcanota mountain range in the Andes of Peru, about  high. It is located in the Puno Region, Carabaya Province, in the districts Corani and Ollachea. Jori Pintay lies southeast of the mountains Sullulluni and Llusca Ritti, and northeast of the mountain Quello Cunca.

References

Mountains of Peru
Mountains of Puno Region